Innocent Blood may refer to:

Innocent Blood (novel), a 1980 novel by P. D. James
Innocent Blood (album), a 1989 album by Resurrection Band 
Innocent Blood (film), a 1992 film by John Landis